Sony Channel is a brand of general entertainment television channels, owned by Sony Pictures Television. It was previously known as Sony Entertainment Television (SET), but many of the channels, except the Indian television channel, were rebranded as Sony Channel.

Current channels

Defunct channels

See also 
Sony Entertainment Television in India
AXN White (Portugal) and AXN White (Spain), formerly known as Sony Entertainment Television until 2012